Pegasus is an open-source workflow management system. It provides the necessary abstractions for scientists to create scientific workflows and allows for transparent execution of these workflows on a range of computing platforms including high performance computing clusters, clouds, and national cyberinfrastructure. In Pegasus, workflows are described abstractly as directed acyclic graphs (DAGs) using a provided API for Jupyter Notebooks, Python, R, or Java. During execution, Pegasus translates the constructed abstract workflow into an executable workflow which is executed and managed by HTCondor.

Pegasus is being used in a number of different disciplines including astronomy, gravitational-wave physics, bioinformatics, earthquake engineering, and helioseismology. Notably, the LIGO Scientific Collaboration has used it to directly detect a gravitational wave for the first time.

Area of applications 
Application examples:
 Gravitational-Wave Physics
 Earthquake Science 
 Bioinformatics
 Workflows for Volcanic Mass Flows
 Diffusion Image Processing and Analysis
 Spallation Neutron Source (SNS)

History 
The development of Pegasus started in 2001.

See also 
 Distributed computing
 Workflow Management System

References

Workflow applications
Free software